The Bemidji State Beavers women's ice hockey program represented the Bemidji State University during the 2018-19 NCAA Division I women's ice hockey season.

Offseason

Recruiting

2018–19 Beavers

Standings

2018–19 Schedule

|-
!colspan=12 style=""| Regular Season

|-
!colspan=12 style=""| WCHA Tournament

References

Bemidji State
Bemidji State Beavers women's ice hockey seasons
Bemidji